Iffley is a village in a designated Conservation Area in Oxfordshire, England. It lies within the boundaries of the city of Oxford, between Cowley and the estates of Rose Hill and Donnington, and in proximity to the River Thames (Isis). A notable feature is its largely unchanged Norman church, St Mary the Virgin, which has a modern stained glass Nativity window designed by John Piper and another window designed by Roger Wagner. The church is a Grade I listed building.

History

The ending of the name of this village near Oxford, means "cleared ground": the Old English term for that was "ley" — just up the road from modern Iffley, the town of Cowley also preserves the Old English ending and meaning in its name. No records of the foundation of Iffley have been found, but the reason for its founding is clear from the location: Iffley has a little hill, and so is the first place downriver from Oxford from which traffic on the Thames might be surveyed, and controlled — and where people might be safe from floods:

During the 12th century Oxford townsmen built a watermill at Iffley, which was bought by Lincoln College, Oxford in 1445: the mill burned in 1908, having survived for nearly 800 years. Products ground at the Iffley mill included malt, barley, corn and other cereals — for a brief time during the 15th century it was a fulling mill. The mill,

In 1156 Iffley was among the holdings of the Norman family of St. Remy, until about 1200. They established Iffley as a parish, and built the parish church, "in size and decorative splendour out of all proportion to the place". The manor was owned by many, thereafter. The Archdeacons of Oxford were given the right to appoint the parish priest in 1279: they held this until 1965, when the power was given to the Dean and Chapter of Christ Church, Oxford.

Domesday Book entry

Iffley Meadows
Iffley Meadows is a nature reserve occupying much of Iffley Island, an area of flood-meadow on the opposite side of the Thames. The reserve is managed by the Berkshire, Buckinghamshire and Oxfordshire Wildlife Trust on behalf of Oxford City Council. The meadows are notable for their large population of snake's head fritillaries.

Notable people
Thomas Nowell (1730–1801), clergyman and historian
Frank Bickerton (1889–1954) Antarctic explorer and World War I aviator
John Grimley Evans (1936–2018), gerontologist
 Peggy Seeger (b.1935), American folk singer
 Stephen R. Lawhead (b. 1950), writer
 Barten Holyday (1593–1661), clergyman, poet, and translator

See also
The village of Iffley has given its name to:

 St Mary the Virgin, Iffley, the parish church
 Iffley College, the original name of Wolfson College
 , a former railway station on the Wycombe Railway
 Iffley Lock on the River Isis
 Iffley Mill, locally famous for the spectacular fire that burnt it down in 1908
 Iffley Road in east Oxford

References

Sources

External links

 Iffley Village Friends
 Iffley Parish
 Iffley Music Society
 Iffley History Society
 Iffley Conservation Area 

Villages in Oxfordshire
Areas of Oxford
Populated places on the River Thames